This is a list of films produced in Algeria.

Award-winning Algerian films

A
À l'ombre des chênes (1974)
Adhilai al beida (1991)
Al-Salam Al-Walid (1965), also known as So Young a Peace 
Algérie, entre douleur et liberté (2000)
Ali au pays des mirages (1981), also known as Ali fi bilad al-sarab or Ali in Wonderland (1978)
Aliénations (2004)
Après-Octobre, L (1989)
Arc-en-ciel éclaté, L (1998), also known as The Blown-out Rainbow
Arche du désert, L (1998)
Asfour, al- (1972), also known as The Sparrow
Asino d'oro: processo per fatti strani contro Lucius Apuleius cittadino romano, L (1970)
Attente des femmes, L''' (2001)Aube des damnés, L (1966), also known as Dawn of the DamnedAutomne... Octobre à Alger (1993)Autre monde, L (2001), also known as Other World, The (2004) (USA: literal English title)Aveux les plus doux, Les (1971)Awdat al ibn al dal (1976), also known as Return of the Prodigal Son, The (1976)Aziza (1980)Aïd El Kebir (1999)

BBab El-Oued City (1994)Bab el web (2005)Bal, Le (1983)Barakat! (2006)Battaglia di Algeri, La (1966), also known as Battle of Algiers, The (1967) (USA)Beur blanc rouge (2006)Blouson vert, Le (1998)Bonnes familles, Les (1972)Brancaleone alle crociate (1970)Buamama (1985)

CCamp de Thiaroye (1987)Cheb (1991)Chemins de l'oued, Les (2002), also known as Under Another SkyChronique des années de braise (1975)Clan destin (1999)Colline oubliée, La (1997)Communiqué, Le (1969)Couleurs d'enfants (1994)Cousines (2004)

DDelice Paloma (2007)Dernière image, La (1986)Douar de femmes (2005), also known as Hamlet of Women Dounia (1998)Décembre (1972)Dévoilée femme, La (1998)

EEldridge Cleaver (1970)Enfer à dix ans, L (1968)Élise ou la vraie vie (1970)Évasion de Hassan Terro, L (1974)Enfer à dix ans, L (1968)

F
Faham, El (1973), also known as Charcoal Maker, The (1973)
Femmes d'Alger (1992)
Festival panafricain d'Alger (1970)
fil algerien complet (all the films)
Folles années du twist, Les (1986)
Frontières (2001)

G
Ghoula, El (1972)
Guerre de libération (1973), also known as War of Liberation (1973)
Guerre Sans Images (2002)
Génération de guerre (1971)

H
Haçla (2003)
Harem de madame Osmane, Le (1993)
Hassan terro (1967)
Histoire d'une rencontre (1985)
Histoires de la révolution (1969)
Honneur de la tribu, L''' (1993)Hors-la-loi, Les (1968)hors la loi (2009)How Big Is Your Love (2011)Héritage, L (1975), also known as Legacy, The (1975)

I
Il était une fois dans l'oued (2005)
Ilo Tsy Very (1987)
Inch'Allah dimanche (2001)
Indigènes (2006)
inland gabbla (2009)
Iskanderija... lih? (1978), also known as Alexandria... Why?

J
J'ai habité l'absence deux fois, de Drifa Mezenner (2011)
Jean Farès (2001)
Jowjet libni (1982), also known as Wife for My Son, A

K
Kalaa, El, also known as Citadel, The (1988)

L
Leïla et les autres (1977)
Little Senegal (2001)
Louss, warda al-rimal (1988)
Lettre à ma soeur, de Habiba Djahnine (2006)

M
Machano (1996)
Made In (1999)
Magique, Le (1996)
Mains libres, Les (1964)
Manara, El (2004)
Maquam Echahid (1984)
Message d'Alger (1998)
Moissons d'acier (1983)
Montagne de Baya, La (1997)
Morituri (2007)
Mughamarat batal (1979)

N
[[Nahla (film)|Nahla]] (1979), entered into the 11th Moscow International Film FestivalNomades, Les (1975)Noua (1972)Nouba, La (1979)

OOmar Gatlato (1976), entered into the 10th Moscow International Film FestivalL'Opium et le Bâton (1971), entered into the 7th Moscow International Film Festival

PPapicha (2019)Patrouille à l'Est (1971)Peuple en marche (1963)Poussières de vie, also known as Dust of Life (1995)Premier pas (1979)Prends 10000 balles et casse-toi (1981)Père (2004)

RRachida (2002)Remparts d'argile (1968)Rih al awras (1966), also known as Winds of the Aures, The or Le Vent Des Aurès.  Entered into the 1967 Cannes Film Festival and the 5th Moscow International Film FestivalRome plutôt que vous (Roma wa la n'touma/Rome Rather Than You) de Tarik Teguia (2006)Rupture (1982)Rückkehr aus der Wüste, Die (1990), also known as Return from the Desert (1990)

SSalut cousin! (1996)Sanaoud (1972)Seekers of Oblivion (2004)Soleil assassiné, Le (2003), also known as Assassinated Sun, The (2003)Song of Umm Dalaila, the Story of the Sahrawis (1993)Straniero, Lo (1967), also known as Black SweatSuspects, Les (2004)

TTahia ya didou! (1971)Thé d'Ania, Le (2004)Tomorrow, Algiers? (2011)Tre pistole contro Cesare (1966)

UUn rêve algérien (2003)Une femme taxi à Sidi Bel-Abbès, also known as Female Cabby in Sidi Bel-Abbes, A (2000)Until the end of Time (2017)

VVacances de l'inspecteur Tahar, Les (1972)Velikij turan (1995)Vent de sable (1982)Viva Laldjérie also known as Viva Algeria (2004)Vivre au paradis also known as Living in Paradise (1998)Voie, La (1967)Voisine, La (2002)

WWalo Fendo (1999)
West Indies (1979)

YYa ouled (1993)Yelema (1993)Youcef (1994)

Z[[Z (1969 film)|Z]] (1969)
Zabana! (2012)
Zerda ou les chantes de l'oubli, La (1983)
Zone interdite (1974)

References

External links
 Algeriian film at the Internet Movie Database

Algeria

Films
Algeria